Sean O'Brien may refer to:

Sportspeople
Seán O'Brien (Gaelic footballer), Gaelic footballer for Nemo Rangers
Seán O'Brien (Cork hurler) (1926–?), Irish hurler
Seán O'Brien (Tipperary hurler), Irish hurler
Sean O'Brien (ice hockey) (born 1972), American former ice hockey left winger
Seán O'Brien (rugby union, born 1987), Irish rugby union international flanker for Leinster and London Irish
Seán O'Brien (rugby union, born 1994), Irish rugby union flanker for Connacht
Seán O'Brien (rugby union, born 1998), Irish rugby union centre for Connacht
Seán O'Brien (rugby union, born 2000), American-born Irish rugby union flanker for Leinster
Sean O'Brien (windsurfer) (born 1984), Australian windsurfer
Sean O'Brien (footballer), English footballer

Other people
Sean O'Brien (writer) (born 1952), British writer
Sean C. O'Brien, co-discoverer of buckminsterfullerene
Sean O'Brien (labor leader), US trade unionist
Sean O'Brien (musician), bassist and original member of Boston rock band Come
Sean O'Brien (Ohio politician) (born 1969), Democratic member of the Ohio Senate

See also
John O'Brien (disambiguation)
Sean O'Bryan (born 1963), American actor
Shaun O'Brien (disambiguation)